Tadeo O'Farrell (also Tadhg O'Farrell, Tadhg MacEoga, or Thady Farrell) (died 1602) was a Roman Catholic prelate who served as Bishop of Clonfert (1587–1602) and Auxiliary Bishop of Sigüenza, (1589–1599).

Biography 
O'Farrell was ordained a priest in the Order of Preachers. On 8 June 1587, he was appointed during the papacy of Pope Sixtus V as Bishop of Clonfert. On 30 August 1587, he was consecrated bishop by Girolamo Bernerio, Bishop of Ascoli Piceno, with Edmund MacGauran, Archbishop of Armagh, and Agostino Quinzio, Bishop of Korčula, serving as co-consecrators. In 1589, he was appointed during the papacy of Pope Sixtus V as Auxiliary Bishop of Sigüenza. In 1599, he resigned as Auxiliary Bishop of Sigüenza. He served as Bishop of Clonfert until his death in 1602.

References 

16th-century Roman Catholic bishops in Ireland
17th-century Roman Catholic bishops in Ireland
Bishops appointed by Pope Sixtus V
1602 deaths